The 2022 Real Salt Lake season is the team's 18th year of existence, and their 18th consecutive season in Major League Soccer, the top division of the American soccer pyramid. On December 13, 2021, RSL hired Pablo Mastroeni to be the sixth manager in club history, removing the interim tag he had held since taking over for Freddy Juarez on August 27, 2021.

Competitions

Preseason
The club's preseason schedule was announced on January 9, 2022. Originally, the club would have attended the 2022 Desert Showcase match with Seattle Sounders FC, however, the club opted out from the event due to scheduling conflicts and technical considerations. Real Salt Talk was replaced with Sounders' rival, the Portland Timbers for that match The club however, would still train in Tucson.

MLS regular season

Standings

Western Conference Table

Overall table

Results summary

MLS Cup Playoffs

U.S. Open Cup

Leagues Cup

Stats

Squad appearances
As of October 16, 2022

Goals
Stats from MLS Regular season, MLS play offs, CONCACAF Champions league, and U.S. Open Cup are all included.
First tie-breaker for goals is assists.

Assists
Stats from MLS Regular season, MLS play offs, CONCACAF Champions league, and U.S. Open Cup are all included.
First tie-breaker for assists is minutes played.

Shutouts
Stats from MLS Regular season, MLS play offs, CONCACAF Champions league, and U.S. Open Cup are all included.
First tie-breaker for shutouts is minutes played.

Club

Roster

,

Transfers
'

In

Out

Loans

In

Out

Trialist

Notes

References

Real Salt Lake seasons
Real Salt Lake
Real Salt
Real Salt